Archibasis lieftincki, is a species of damselfly in family Coenagrionidae. It is endemic to Sri Lanka.

Sources 

 http://animaldiversity.org/accounts/Archibasis_lieftincki/classification/

Insects of Sri Lanka
Insects described in 2013